The 2012–13 Utah Valley Wolverines men's basketball team represented Utah Valley University in the 2012–13 college basketball season. This was head coach Dick Hunsaker's eleventh season at UVU. The Wolverines played their home games at the UCCU Center and were members of the Great West Conference. They finished the season 14–18, 3–5 in Great West play to finish in a three way tie for third place. They lost in the first round of the Great West tournament to Houston Baptist.

This was Utah Valley's final season in the Great West. The Wolverines will join the WAC starting in the 2013–14 season.

Roster

Schedule and results
Source

|-
!colspan=12 style="background:#006633; color:#CFB53B;"| Regular season

|-
!colspan=12| 2013 Great West Conference men's basketball tournament

References

Utah Valley Wolverines men's basketball seasons
Utah Valley